The 1938 Bulgarian Cup  (in this period the tournament was named Tsar's Cup) was the first cup competition, which took place in parallel to the national championship. The cup was won by FC 13 Sofia after their opponents Levski Ruse left the field during the final at the Yunak Stadium in Sofia.

First round 

|-
!colspan=3 style="background-color:#D0F0C0;" |4 September 1938

|}

Quarter-finals 

|-
!colspan=3 style="background-color:#D0F0C0;" |11 September 1938

|}

Semi-finals 

|-
!colspan=3 style="background-color:#D0F0C0;" |18 September 1938

|}

Final

Details

1938
Bulgarian Cup
Cup